Ioan Ovidiu Sabău (born 12 February 1968) is a Romanian professional football manager and former player, who is currently in charge of Liga I club Universitatea Cluj.

Club career
Ioan Sabău, nicknamed Moțul after the people from Țara Moților because of his ambition, was born on 12 February 1968 in Câmpia Turzii, starting to play football at junior level in 1985 at Universitatea Cluj, under the guidance of coaches Alexa Uifăleanu and Nicolae Szoboszlay. He made his professional debut playing for Universitatea in the 1984–85 Divizia B season under coach Remus Vlad, helping the team win promotion to Divizia A, where in the following season he made his debut on 8 March 1986, replacing Nicolae Bucur for the last 9 minutes of a 1–0 loss against Rapid București, also under the guidance of coach Remus Vlad. In 1988, Sabău had offers from Dinamo București and Steaua București, choosing to play for the first because of coach Mircea Lucescu's project of building a team composed of mainly young players like himself. But Steaua's officials with president Ion Alecsandrescu and the relatives of dictator Nicolae Ceaușescu, his son Valentin who was Steaua's unofficial president and brother Ilie who was a Romanian army general insisted and pressured Sabău on several occasions to sign with the club, especially during his military service in which he played for Ministry of National Defence club and friend team of Steaua, ASA Târgu Mureş, but he refused, eventually going to Dinamo who gave four players to Universitatea Cluj in exchange for him, including Florin Prunea. He spent two seasons with The Red Dogs, in the first one he did not win any trophies and reached the quarter-finals in the 1988–89 European Cup Winners' Cup where they were eliminated on the away goals rule after 1–1 on aggregate by Sampdoria and in the following season the club won the title and the cup with Sabău playing 24 Divizia A matches in which he scored five goals and scored one goal in the 6–4 victory from the 1990 Cupa României Final against Steaua București, also appearing in 7 matches in which he scored two goals in the 1989–90 European Cup Winners' Cup where Dinamo reached the semi-finals where they were eliminated after 2–0 on aggregate by Anderlecht. After the 1989 Romanian Revolution, Sabău was transferred by Dinamo at Feyenoord for over one million$, where he spent two seasons, winning two cups and one supercup, also helping the club reach the 1991–92 European Cup Winners' Cup semi-finals, appearing in 3 matches from the campaign and was colleague in his second season with fellow Romanian, Marian Damaschin. In 1992 he was sold by Feyenoord to Mircea Lucescu's Brescia for over one million€, playing two seasons in Serie A and two in Serie B a period in which he was declared the best right midfielder from Serie A in 1993, managed to win the Anglo-Italian Cup in 1994 and was colleague with compatriots Gheorghe Hagi, Florin Răducioiu, Dorin Mateuț and Dănuț Lupu, the team's nickname being "Brescia Romena". In July 1996, Lucescu signed with Serie A club, Reggiana, bringing Ioan Sabău with him, but the team finised on the last place in the end of the season. After another Serie A season at Brescia, Sabău returned to Romania in 1998 at Rapid București, at the advice of coach Mircea Lucescu, appearing in 22 matches in which he scored one goal in the 1998–99 season, helping the team win the first title after 32 years. In the 2000–01 season, he was a player-coach at Universitatea Cluj in Divizia C, helping the team win promotion to Divizia B, leaving shortly afterwards because of a conflict with the club's officials. In 2001, he returned to play for Rapid for two seasons, winning the 2002–03 Divizia A title, playing 16 Divizia A matches in which he scored one goal, also winning a cup and a supercup with coach Mircea Rednic and made his last Divizia A appearance on 24 May 2003 in a 3–0 home victory against UTA Arad. He made his last appearance as a footballer at the end of the 2004–05 Divizia B season for Gaz Metan Mediaș, a team which he was also at that time its head coach. Ioan Sabău has a total of 70 matches and six goals scored in Serie A, 55 matches and six goals scored in Serie B, 39 games with 11 goals scored in Eredivisie, 172 appearances and 17 goals scored in Divizia A and 25 games played with 3 goals scored in European competitions. A book about him was written by Ilie Dobre, called Ioan Ovidiu Sabău și Patima fotbalului (Ioan Ovidiu Sabău and the passion for football).

International career
Ioan Sabău played 55 games and scored 8 goals for Romania, making his debut on 3 February 1988 at age 19 under coach Emerich Jenei in a friendly which ended with a 2–0 away victory against Israel. He scored his first goal three days later in a friendly which ended 2–2 against Poland. He played 6 matches and scored two goals at the successful 1990 World Cup qualifiers, one in a 3–0 victory against Greece and one in the 3–1 victory against Denmark which was decisive for the qualification at the final tournament where he was used by coach Emerich Jenei as a starter in all four matches, as Romania got eliminated by Ireland in the eight-finals. He played 7 games and scored one goal at the Euro 1992 qualifiers, made 8 appearances at the successful 1994 World Cup qualifiers but could not be part of the squad that went to play at the final tournament because of an injury. He played one game at the successful Euro 1996 qualifiers, being selected by coach Anghel Iordănescu to be part of the squad that went at the final tournament but did not play a single match, being injured. Ioan Sabău played three games at the successful Euro 2000 qualifiers but was not selected to take part at the final tournament and made his last three appearances for the national team at the 2002 World Cup qualifiers, one in a group match against Hungary which ended with a 2–0 away victory and two in both legs of the play-off against Slovenia which was lost with 3–2 on aggregate.

For representing his country at the 1990 World Cup, Sabău was decorated by President of Romania Traian Băsescu on 25 March 2008 with the Ordinul "Meritul Sportiv" – (The Medal "The Sportive Merit") class III.

International

International goals
Scores and results list Romania's goal tally first, score column indicates score after each Sabău goal.

Managerial career
Ioan Sabău started his coaching career in 2000 with Universitatea Cluj in Divizia C, also being a player, helping the team win promotion to Divizia B, leaving shortly afterwards because of a conflict with the club's officials. At the beginning of the 2003–04 Divizia B, he returned at Universitatea, but left after only two games, going to coach fellow Divizia B team, Gaz Metan Mediaș for two seasons, but did not manage to win a promotion to Divizia A. In 2005 he went to coach Divizia A club, Gloria Bistrița for four seasons, the highlights of this period being a sixth-place finish at the end of the 2006–07 season and a 2–1 home victory against Atlético Madrid in the 2007 UEFA Intertoto Cup final, however the second leg was lost with 1–0, thus losing the final on the away goals rule. In the 2009–10 season, Sabău coached Politehnica Timișoara, eliminating UEFA Cup holders Shakhtar Donetsk in the third round of the 2009–10 Champions League, which was his former coach, Mircea Lucescu's team, but was eliminated by VfB Stuttgart in the next round, reaching the 2009–10 Europa League group stage which he did not pass and finished the championship on the 5th position. In the following years, he went to coach first league clubs, FCM Târgu Mureș on two occasions and Rapid București, his last spell as a coach being in the second league at ASA Târgu Mureș, without any notable results. Ioan Sabău has a total of 226 matches as a manager in the Romanian top-division, Divizia A consisting of 86 victories, 56 draws and 84 losses.

Personal life
Sabău is featured on the cover of FIFA 96, playing for Brescia in a match against Notts County at the Anglo-Italian Cup final in a duel with Andy Legg, being the first Romanian that appeared on the cover of a FIFA video game. He is a member of the Jehovah's Witnesses.

Honours

Player
Universitatea Cluj
Divizia B: 1984–85
Divizia C: 2000–01
Dinamo București
Divizia A: 1989–90
Cupa României: 1989–90
Feyenoord
KNVB Cup: 1990–91, 1991–92
Johan Cruijff Shield: 1991
Brescia
Anglo-Italian Cup: 1993–94
Rapid București
Divizia A: 1998–99, 2002–03
Cupa României: 2001–02
Supercupa României: 1999, 2002

Coach
Universitatea Cluj
Divizia C: 2000–01

References

External links

Ioan Sabău at 4everucluj.ro
Ioan Sabău at Labtof.ro

1968 births
People from Câmpia Turzii
Living people
Romanian footballers
Association football midfielders
FC Universitatea Cluj players
FC Dinamo București players
Feyenoord players
Brescia Calcio players
A.C. Reggiana 1919 players
FC Rapid București players
Liga I players
Liga II players
Liga III players
Eredivisie players
Serie A players
Serie B players
Romania international footballers
1990 FIFA World Cup players
UEFA Euro 1996 players
Romanian expatriate footballers
Expatriate footballers in the Netherlands
Expatriate footballers in Italy
Romanian expatriate sportspeople in the Netherlands
Romanian expatriate sportspeople in Italy
Romanian football managers
FC Universitatea Cluj managers
FC Politehnica Timișoara managers
FC Rapid București managers
Romanian Jehovah's Witnesses
ACF Gloria Bistrița managers
CS Gaz Metan Mediaș managers
ASA 2013 Târgu Mureș managers